Hukusjøen is a lake in Innlandet county, Norway. The  lake lies on the border of the municipalities of Grue and Åsnes.

See also
List of lakes in Norway

References

Åsnes
Grue, Norway
Lakes of Innlandet